Hazaribagh is a city and a municipal corporation in Hazaribagh district in the Indian state of Jharkhand. It is the divisional headquarters of North Chotanagpur division. It is considered as a health resort and is also popular for Hazaribagh Wildlife Sanctuary ( from city). It is represented in the Indian Lok Sabha by its Member of Parliament Jayant Sinha.

Etymology
The name of the town 'Hazaribagh' (हज़ारीबाग़) is derived from two Persian words: Hazar (هزار) meaning 'one thousand' and bagh (باغ) meaning 'garden'. Hence the meaning of Hazaribagh is 'city of a thousand gardens'. According to Sir John Houlton, however, the town takes its name from the small villages of Okni and Hazari – shown on old maps as Ocunhazry. The last syllable in its name probably originated from a mango grove which formed a camping ground for troops and travelers marching along a military road from Kolkata to Varanasi, constructed in 1783 and the following years. The Grand Trunk Road subsequently replaced this military road in the mid-19th century, but the layout differed at places, particularly around Hazaribagh. A dilapidated watch tower meant to guard the military road is still visible on Tower Hill, near Silwar. In common literature, native English author Kajol Aikat has also mentioned Hazaribagh as the Land of Thousand Gardens in his debut novel Unsocial Amigos.

History
In ancient times the district was covered with inaccessible forests inhabited by tribes who remained independent. The entire territory of Chhotanagpur, now known as Jharkhand (meaning forest territory) was presumably beyond the pale of outside influence in ancient India. Throughout the Turko-Afghan period (up to 1526), the area remained virtually free from external influence. It was only with the accession of Akbar to the throne of Delhi in 1557 that Muslim influence penetrated Jharkhand, then known to the Mughals as Kokrah. In 1585, Akbar sent a force under the command of Shahbaj Khan to reduce the Raja of Chotanagpur to the position of a tributary. After the death of Akbar in 1605, the area presumably regained its independence. This necessitated an expedition in 1616 by Ibrahim Khan Fateh Jang, the Governor of Bihar and brother of Queen Noorjehan. Ibrahim Khan defeated and captured Durjan Sal, the 46th Raja of Chotanagpur. He was imprisoned for 12 years but was later released and reinstated on the throne after he had shown his ability in distinguishing a real diamond from a fake one.

In 1632, Chotanagpur was given as Jagir (endowment) to the Governor at Patna for an annual payment of Rs.136,000. This was raised to Rs.161,000 in 1636. During the reign of Muhammad Shah (1719–1748), Sarballand Khan, the Governor of then Bihar, marched against the Raja of Chotanagpur and obtained his submission. Another expedition was led by Fakhruddoula, the Governor of Bihar in 1731. He came to terms with the Raja of Chotanagpur. In 1735 Alivardi Khan had some difficulty in enforcing the payment of the annual tribute of Rs.12,000 from the Raja of Ramgarh, as agreed to by the latter according to the terms settled with Fakhruddoula.

This situation continued until the occupation of the country by the British. During the Muslim period, the main estates in the district were Ramgarh, Kunda, Chai and Kharagdiha. Subsequent to the Kol uprising in 1831 that, however, did not seriously affect Hazaribagh, the administrative structure of the territory was changed. The parganas of Ramgarh, Kharagdiha, Kendi and Kunda became parts of the South-West Frontier Agency and were formed into a division named Hazaribagh as the administrative headquarters. In 1854 the designation of South-West Frontier Agency was changed to Chota Nagpur Division, composed of five districts - Hazaribagh, Ranchi, Palamau, Manbhum, and Singhbhum. The division was administered as a Non-regulation province under a Commissioner reporting to the Lieutenant Governor of Bengal. In 1855-56 there was the great uprising of the Santhals against the British but was brutally suppressed. During British rule, one had to go by train to Giridih and then travel in a vehicle called push-push to Hazaribagh. It was pushed and pulled by human force over hilly tracts. It was an exciting journey across rivers and through dense forests infested with bandits and wild animals. Rabindranath Tagore travelled in a push-push along the route in 1885. He recorded the experience in an essay, "Chotanagpur families". When the Grand Chord railway line was opened in 1906, Hazaribagh Road railway station became the link with the town. For many years, Lal Motor Company operated the rail-cum-bus service between Hazaribagh town and Hazaribagh Road railway station. In 1912, a new province of Bihar and Orissa was split from Bengal Province. In 1936, the province was split into separate provinces of Bihar and Orissa, with the Chota Nagpur Division being a part of Bihar. Bihar's boundaries remained mostly unchanged after Indian Independence in 1947. Giridih district was created in 1972 by carving some parts of Hazaribagh district. After the 1991 census, the district of Hazaribagh was divided into three separate districts, Hazaribagh, Chatra and Koderma. The two sub-divisions Chatra and Koderma were upgraded to the status of independent districts. In 2000, Jharkhand was separated from Bihar to become India's 28th state. In 2007, Ramgarh was separated and made into the 24th district of Jharkhand.

Hazaribagh town
The Town became a cantonment in 1790, the Ramgarh battalion having been raised ten years earlier. It was then part of Ramgarh district. It became a district headquarters in 1834. Hazaribagh was constituted as a municipality in 1869. The military cantonment, south-east of the town, flourished until 1874, when, after an outbreak of enteric fever in 1874, the troops were mostly withdrawn, except for a small detachment to mind the penitentiary. This resulted in a planned city. This part of the town is known as Boddam Bazar, after the officer who laid it out. Many Englishmen settled in Hazaribagh during the British period. They built large bungalow-type houses, often with sloping roofs. They were great hunters and hunting stories abounded in the town by word of mouth. Most of them left after India became independent. Tutu Imam topped the list of hunting legends in the town along with Prof. Rajendra Pandey. A century ago it was common for tigers and leopards to prey upon livestock in the outskirts of the town. The town had a population of 15,799 in the 1901 census. It was described in as "little more than a cluster of hamlets, with intervening cultivation, which sprang up around the former military bazar." Hazaribagh Central Jail housed many leaders of the Indian freedom movement, including Dr. Rajendra Prasad, later the first President of India. After Jayaprakash Narayan was put under arrest in this jail during the Quit India Movement of 1942, he escaped with the help of 53 dhotis (sheets) to cross the wall of the jail. The support he received from the local people is one of the legends of the Indian Independence movement. During the early years of World War II, an internment camp ("parole camp") for German civilians was established in the town. In June 1942 it housed 36 women, 5 men and 16 children, of whom 21 females with 13 children were transferred on 25 February 1942 from Diyatalawa. In autumn they were transferred to the family camps at Purandhar or Satara.

Early settlers
A small but effective Bengali community including, Mukherjee, Ghosh and Aikats settled at Hazaribagh in the 19th century when the area was in Bengal Presidency and the British administration was looking for people with English education. These families made significant contributions to keep the local education system going. Rai Bahadur Jadunath Mukherjee was amongst the most talked about early Bengali settlers. He was the first Government Pleader of Hazaribagh so appointed in 1864. He established the Hazaribagh Brahmo Samaj in 1867 by donating his own land. He established the Jadunath Girls School in 1873 donating his own land (later upgraded Jadunath Girls High School in 1956 and around 1920, a new school building was built with the initiative of Bengali families such as Braja Kumar Niyogi and Chanchala Niyogi with funds from various sources such as the estate of Raja of Ramgarh). Rai Bhadur Jadunath Mukherjee was foremost in establishing the Keshav Hal and Library in the Town and was its first President. He was prominent amongst those who established the Hazaribagh Bongiya Durga Bari in 1889 in his compound. He provided food for work programme during the 1873-1874 Bihar Famine. His house hosted a galaxy of great Indians such as Ramananda Chattopadhaya, Sanjib Chandra Chattopadhaya (of "Palamau" fame), Rabindranath Tagore and Indira Debi. Later, scholars such as Mahesh Chandra Ghosh and Dhirendranath Choudhury made the town their home. The poet Kamini Roy lived in the town for some years. Manmathanath Dasgupta, a Brahmo missionary spent many years in Hazaribagh working amongst the downtrodden. Surat Kumar Gupta contributed towards the development of the town in many ways. Doctors such as Mandindra Bhushan Banerjee (Panna Babu), Bikash Kumar Sen, Sambhu Nath Roy and Benoy Chandra Chatterjee were prominent personalities. The noted Bengali author and writer for many Hindi films like Sujata, Subodh Ghosh, was born and brought up in Hazaribagh. Many of his stories are set in the region. Keshub Chunder Sen, the great Brahmo Leader, accompanied by Trailokyanath Sanyal, visited Hazaribagh in 1874 to recoup his health. He wrote many pieces during his short stay and participated in Bhadrotsav celebrations. After his death in 1884, a public hall on the Main Road was named Kesab Hall in his memory. Amongst the Brahmo missionaries who visited Hazaribagh regularly was Pramathalal Sen.

Geography

Demographics 

As per the 2011 Census of India, Hazaribagh Urban Agglomeration had a total population of 153,599, of which males were 80,095 and females 73,504. Hazaribagh Urban Agglomeration is composed of Hazaribagh (Nagar Nigam) and Okni (Census Town). As per the 2011 Census of India, Hazaribagh Nagar Parishad had a total population of 142,489, of which 74,132 were males and 68,357 females. Scheduled Castes numbered 7,987 and Scheduled Tribes numbered 2,708.  India census, Hazaribagh had a population of 127,243. Males constitute 53% of the population and females 47%. Hazaribagh has an average literacy rate of 76%, higher than the national average of 64.83%: male literacy is 81%, and female literacy is 70%. In Hazaribagh, 13% of the population is under 6 years of age. The population of the town and the area is overwhelmingly Khortha speaking, However, due to migration of people from other state people Hindi is also spoken but mainly in town areas. There is a sprinkling of the Santhali-speaking population mainly in the rural areas. The Hindus form the majority of population, with a sizable Muslim population. Punjabis form small minorities. Hazaribagh was upgraded to a municipal corporation in June 2015 by adding the area and population of 19 adjoining villages. As per the 2011 census, the total number of literates in Hazaribagh UA was 122,881 (90.14 percent of the total population) out of whom 66,602 (93.82 percent of males) were males and 56,279 (86.14 percent of females) were females. As per the 2011 census, the total number of literates in Hazaribagh Nagar Parishad was 112,533, out of whom 60,840 were males and 51,693 were females.

Infrastructure
According to the District Census Handbook 2011, Hazaribagh, Hazaribagh (nagar parishad) covered an area of 26.35 km2. Among the civic amenities, it had 269 km roads with both open and closed drains, the protected water supply involved tap water from treated sources, uncovered wells, overhead tank. It had 23,825 domestic electric connections, 1,405 road lighting points. Among the educational facilities it had 28 primary schools, 22 middle schools, 15 secondary schools, 4 senior secondary schools, 5 general degree colleges. It had 1 medical college, 1 engineering college, 1 management institute/ college, 1 polytechnic, 2 recognised shorthand, typewriting, and vocational training institutions, 1 non-formal education centre (Sarva Siksha Abhiyan). Among the social, recreational and cultural facilities, it had 1 special school for disabled, 1 orphanage home, 3 working women's hostels, 1 old age home, 2 stadiums, 5 cinema theatres, 3 auditorium/ community halls, 3 public library and reading rooms. Three important commodities it manufactured were sattu, agarbatti, rice mill products, furniture. It had branches of 14 nationalised banks, 8 private commercial banks, 1 co-operative bank, 1 agricultural credit society, 19 non-agricultural credit societies.

Climate

Konar River, a tributary of Damodar River, flows past the town. Hazaribagh has been a thick forest earlier and is still surrounded by forests.

Economy

Industry
Hazaribagh has the second highest coal reserve in Jharkhand (Dhanbad region has the first), and it is still largely intact. Recently there has been a spurt in the coal mining activities in the region by Central Coalfields Ltd., a subsidiary of Coal India Limited. Work is currently going on for the development of NTPC's 3000 MW. Reliance Power's 3600 MW Super Thermal Power Projects was also proposed but was later pulled out due to the failure of the negotiations between government and company on land distributions.
Demotand and Chaano are industrial areas.

Education
 
The Dublin Mission has educational institutions and a women's hospital. Activities of the mission were started at Hazaribagh in 1899, under the aegis of Trinity College, Dublin, Ireland. St. Columba's College was one of the oldest in Bihar. Hazaribagh now has Vinoba Bhave University within the city limits, named after Saint Vinoba Bhave. It is the second largest university of Jharkhand. It also hosts private university AISECT University, Jharkhand. St. Columba's College, Medical College of Dhanbad and many engineering and local colleges are affiliated to this university. Jajnery Institute of Technology, Hazaribagh is a college for Polytechnic, management and IT.

After independence, Roman Catholics established a girls' school, Mount Carmel school Hazaribagh, in 1949. Parallel to this Reverend Father John Moore, an Australian Jesuit missionary, set up St. Xavier's School in 1952. Vivekananda central school hazaribagh cbse affiliated established in 1992. D.A.V Public School Hazaribagh, started in 1992 and run by D.A.V College Managing Committee (New Delhi). National Public School, Hazaribagh, started in 1977, is now affiliated to CBSE, it is managed by L.K.C. Memorial Education Society. Montfort School, Hazaribagh is situated on Kanhari Hill Road. Mount Litera Zee School and Kidzee, Hazaribagh is located at Katgarah Village, opposite the firing range, Meru, Hazaribagh and its city office are situated near the Mission Hospital. It is a network of Zee learn.

Hazaribagh has the police training center for the whole of Jharkhand. The Border Security Force (BSF) also has a large presence. East India's largest training center is here in the forest with hilly terrain. The Central Reserved Police Force is also present in the town near the lake.

Universities
 Vinoba Bhave University

General colleges
 Annada College, Hazaribagh
 Bhadrakali College, Itkhori
 G.M.(Ghanshyam Mehta) Evening College, Ichak
 Karnpura College, Barkagaon
 K.B. Women's College
 Markham College of Commerce
 St. Columba's College, Hazaribagh
 Vananchal College, Tandwa

Intermediate colleges
 Chhotanagpur Inter College, Berokala, Hazaribagh
 Geeta Science Inter Mahavidyalaya, Hazaribagh
 Ghanshyam Mehta Inter College, Ichak, Hazaribagh
 Gulmohar Inter College, Hazaribagh
 Gyan Jyoti Inter College, Hazaribagh
 Inter Science College, Zabra Road, Hazaribagh

Engineering colleges
 University College of Engineering And Technology, Hazaribagh

Medical colleges
 Gyan Jyoti Paramedical & Nursing College, Hazaribag
 Hazaribag College of Dental Sciences & Hospital, Hazaribagh
 Shaheed Sheikh Bhikhari Medical College, Hazaribagh

Teachers training colleges
 Daulat Mahto M.T.T. College, Banaso, Bishnugarh, Hazaribagh
 Deo College of Education, Hazaribagh
 Gautam Buddha T.T. College, Hazaribagh
 Maa Vindhyavashini College of Education, Hazaribagh
 S.B.M. T.T. College, Hazaribagh
 Sri Ram Krishna Sarda Ashram, Teachers Training College, Ravindrapath, Hazaribagh
 Swami Dharmabandhu College of Education, Hazaribagh

Schools
 Angels High School, Hazaribagh
 Carmel School Hazaribagh
 D. A. V. Public School, Hazaribagh, Canary Hill Road
 Delhi Public School Hazaribagh
 Doon Central School, hurhuru.
 Gulmohar Public School, Badkagaon Road, Hazaribagh
 Gyanodaya Central School, Hurhuru
 Jawahar Navodaya Vidyalaya, Bonga, Hazaribagh
 Kendriya Vidyalaya, Hazaribagh
 Montfort School, Hazaribagh
 Mount Litera Zee School, Silwar, Hazaribagh
 Naman Vidya
 St. Augustine's High School, Hazaribagh
 St. Stephen's School, Hazaribagh
 St. Xavier's School, Hazaribagh
 Sangam Public School, Barkagaon
 Sister Nivedita Montessori School
 S.V.N Public School, Jai Prabha Nagar, Hazaribagh
 Vivekananda Central School, Rabindra Path

Politics

Krishna Ballabh Sahay (born in Sheikhpura but had land in Khadhaiya, a village in Tandwa Block), the renowned freedom fighter and subsequently chief minister of Bihar, belonged to Hazaribagh. As revenue minister, he was instrumental in the abolition of zemindaries in Bihar. In 1952 that was the first such legislation in the country. The political rivalry between the Kamakhya Narain Singh, the Raja of Ramgarh, and K.B. Sahay was the talk of the town in the 1950s.

In the elections for the first Lok Sabha held in 1951, Nageshwar Prasad Sinha of Congress won the Hazaribagh East seat, and Baboo Ram Narayan Singh, an Independent candidate, won the Hazaribagh West seat. In 1957, Lalita Rajya Lakshmi, of the Ramgarh Raj family, won the seat. Basant Narayan Singh, the younger brother of Kamakhya Narayan Singh, won the seat four times, in 1962, 1967, 1977, and 1980. Damodar Pandey of Congress won it in 1984. Yadunath Pandey of BJP won it in 1989. Bhubneshwar Prasad Mehta of CPI won the seat in 1991 and in 2004. Mahabir Lal Viswakarma of BJP won the seat in 1996.

Yashwant Sinha of BJP won the seat in 1998 and went on to become Finance Minister and later Foreign Minister in the NDA government. He also won the seat in the 2009 Lok Sabha Elections. Bhubneshwar Prasad Mehta of the Communist Party of India won the seat in 2004 with the help of seat-sharing of the UPA.

Jayant Sinha, a senior leader of the Bharatiya Janata Party and the son of former Foreign Minister Yashwant Sinha, won the Lok Sabha elections in 2014, defeating the closest rival Saurabh Narayan Singh of the Indian National Congress by a huge margin of 1,59,128 votes.

A scion of the erstwhile kingdom of Ramgarh Raj; Rajkumar Udaybhan Narain Singh is the director of J.I.A.D.A. and is a senior member of Bhartiya Janta Party, he has a stronghold over this area.

Transportation

The nearest international airport is Birsa Munda Airport Ranchi, the capital of Jharkhand,. Ranchi is connected with Bengaluru, New Delhi, Hyderabad, Mumbai, Kolkata and Patna by regular flights. The railway line from Hazaribagh to Barkakana Junction has been completed and the trains are running from Hazaribagh to Barkakana. Hazaribagh is situated on NH 33 and the road distances to major cities are: Ranchi , Dhanbad  (via GT road), Bokaro  (via Ramgarh), Gaya , Patna , Daltonganj , and Kolkata (via Dhanbad-Asansol-Govindapur-Bardhaman) . Regular bus service connects Hazaribagh to these places.

Notable residents
A. E. J. Collins (18 August 1885 – 11 November 1914) - held the record for the highest score in cricket (628 not out) for 116 years
Subodh Ghosh - journalist and writer, born at Hazaribagh in 1909; also studied at St. Columba's College
Raj Kumar Gupta - Film Director, born & educated in Hazaribagh.
Bulu Imam - environmental activist, Gandhi International Peace Award Recipient, 2011
Tapen Sen - judge in the Calcutta High Court
Yashwant Sinha - Indian politician and a former finance minister of India (1990–1991) and March 1998 – July 2002. Foreign minister (July 2002 – May 2004)
Rajkumar Udaybhan Narain Singh Independent Director of JIADA and is the grandson of Kamakhya Narain Singh and Basant Narain Singh of the erstwhile kingdom of Ramgarh Raj
 Syed Zafar Islam - Member of Parliament and spokesperson of the Bharatiya Janata Party. Islam is a former investment banker and the former managing director at Deutsche Bank.
Subhash Mukhopadhyay - Founder of India's first child using in-vitro fertilization from a Bengali Family in Hazaribagh.
Mihir Vatsa - Award-winning author of Tales of Hazaribagh: An Intimate Exploration of Chhotanagpur Plateau.

Nearby places
 Konar Dam,  from Hazaribagh
The water is boiling and is beneficial for the treatment of skin diseases and rheumatism.
 Tilaiya Dam across the Barakar River has hillocks all around and there also nestles one Sainik School nearby.
 Ranchi the state capital of Jharkhand,  from the township limit via NH33 (nearest Tropic of Cancer falls on the same highway)

See also
 
 Hazaribagh (community development block)
 Hazaribagh District
List of cities in Jharkhand by population
List of cities in Jharkhand by area

References

External links

 Hazaribag district administration

 
Hill stations in Jharkhand
Cities and towns in Hazaribagh district